Black Russian is a cocktail comprising vodka and coffee liqueur. It may also refer to:
Black Russian Terrier, a breed of dog
Black Russian, a type of Sobranie cigarette
Black Russian, a variety of tomato
Members of the African diaspora who emigrated to Russia
Frederick Bruce Thomas, Mississippi native and the son of former slaves who became a prominent citizen of Moscow and, later, Constantinople
Black Russian, a Motown-label band in 1980